Philaronia is a genus of spittlebugs in the family Aphrophoridae. There are about five described species in Philaronia.

Species
These five species belong to the genus Philaronia:
 Philaronia abjecta (Uhler, 1876)
 Philaronia canadensis (Walley, 1929)
 Philaronia fuscovaria (Stål, 1864)
 Philaronia pauca Hamilton, 1979
 Philaronia superba Hamilton, 1979

References

Articles created by Qbugbot
Aphrophoridae
Auchenorrhyncha genera